Ben Leach (born 2 May 1969 in Liverpool, England) was the keyboard and synthesizer player in the Liverpool-based pop band, The Farm. He joined in 1988 when the band acquired another brass section playing trumpet (also including Bobby Bilsborough on saxophone and David Peel on trombone). When the band decided to drop the brass section in early 1990, Ben became the keyboard player. He was with them at the height of their success in autumn and early winter of 1990, when they achieved chart success with "Groovy Train" and "All Together Now".

He later went on to become keyboard player for the second incarnation of Happy Mondays in the late 1990s.

References

1969 births
Living people
English rock keyboardists
The Farm (band) members
Musicians from Liverpool